Indigo Girls is the second studio album and first major label release by American folk rock duo the Indigo Girls. It was originally released in 1989 by Epic Records, and reissued and remastered in 2000 with two bonus tracks.

Upon its release, the album received mostly positive reviews from critics, went gold after six months and eventually went platinum. The duo was nominated for a Best New Artist Grammy (losing to Milli Vanilli, who later vacated the award), and won one for Best Contemporary Folk Recording.

Michael Stipe sang on "Kid Fears", and the other members of R.E.M. performed on "Tried to Be True". In addition, the Irish band Hothouse Flowers contributed background vocals on several tracks, notably "Closer to Fine".

Track listing

Personnel
Indigo Girls
Amy Ray – lead vocals, guitars
Emily Saliers – lead vocals, guitars, twelve string electric guitar on 2, lead electric guitar on 6

Additional personnel

Peter O'Toole – mandolin on 1 2, backing vocals on 1
Fiachna Ó Braonáin – tin whistle on 1, backing vocals on 1, Hammond organ on 2
Liam Ó Maonlaí – bodhrán on 1, backing vocals on 1
Luka Bloom – backing vocals on 1
Paulinho Da Costa – percussion on 1, 2, 4, 8
Dede Vogt – bass on 2, 3, 7, 10
Jay Dee Daugherty – drums on 2, 4, 8
John Keane – twelve string electric guitar on 3, bass on 4, shaker on 6, slide guitar on 8, 9, bass drum on 9
Michael Stipe – backing vocals on 3
Bill Berry – drums on 6
Peter Buck – electric guitar on 6
Mike Mills – bass on 6
Jai Winding – piano on 7
Kasim Sulton – bass on 8
John Van Tongeren – keyboards on 10

Charts

Certifications

References

Indigo Girls albums
Epic Records albums
1989 albums
Albums produced by Scott Litt
Grammy Award for Best Contemporary Folk Album